Beghelli may refer to:

 Gran Premio Bruno Beghelli, a men's road bicycle race held annually in Monteveglio, Italy
 Beghelli Bologna, a basketball club based in Bologna, Italy